Unterfucking is a populated place in Upper Austria, Austria.

Unterfucking has often been included in lists of places with unusual names.

See also
Fugging, Upper Austria
Oberfucking
Eggerding
Mayrhof

References

Cities and towns in Schärding District